The Dreamer is a 1936 German historical drama film directed by Carl Froelich and starring Emil Jannings, Hilde Weissner, and Harald Paulsen. It is based on the play of the same name by German playwrights Oskar Jerschke and Arno Holz. The film's art direction was by Franz Schroedter, a leading set designer of the era. It premiered at Berlin's Ufa-Palast am Zoo.

Plot 
A small garrison town in northern Germany. Professor Niemeyer is the director of the Königliches Gymnasium there and is nicknamed “Traumulus” by his students because of his traditional views and his unworldly demeanor. His values ​​are those of the last century, and his ideas of decency, custom and morals elicit no more than shakes of the head and astonishment from the young high school students. His favorite student is Kurt von Zedlitz, descendant of an old, respected family. Once again, in the morning hours, the young man returned to the high school dormitory of the school building via the rope ladder. Kurt is teased by his classmates about whether he might have an affair in town and that's why he came back so late this way.

Prof. Niemeyer has prepared a festival play for the ceremony taking place the next morning on the occasion of the inauguration of a monument in honor of Kaiser Wilhelm I. After going to church, Niemeyer meets his old adversary, the District Administrator of Kannewurf, of all people. Kannewurf is delighted to finally be able to mend the headmaster's witness, after all he has heard that Niemeyer's favorite pupil Zedlitz was seen in the company of a sophisticated actress, a certain Lydia Link, in a somewhat shady bar called "The Golden Peacock". Hoping to give Niemeyer the shock of his life, the district administrator rubs this latest gossip in his face with relish.

Traumulus then starts an investigation, and Kurt von Zedlitz admits to this "misdeed", but without adding that he subsequently followed this lady with the dubious reputation to her apartment. Kurt follows the advice of Niemeyer's son from his first marriage, Fritz Niemeyer, who in turn leads an extremely relaxed lifestyle. Fritz Niemeyer's stepmother Jadwiga, Traumulus' second wife, regularly redeems his debts. Fritzen's easy dealings with his father's much younger wife also give rise to some speculation.

While the rehearsals for the Wilhelm celebration are taking place on the market square, the members of the forbidden association “Anti-Tyrannia”, mostly pupils and alumni of the grammar school, meet in the bakery of the master baker Schladebach. After District Administrator von Kannewurf got wind of it, he had the conference venue stormed and the participants arrested. Kurt von Zedlitz is also among those arrested, but that's just by coincidence: he had "lifted" the house arrest imposed by Traumulus on his own initiative and had joined the meeting to suggest to the anti-Tyrannia people that their group should be dissolved. Prof. Niemeyer is shocked when he learns that his favorite student is among those arrested, as he thought he was under house arrest.

Niemeyer is deeply disappointed in Zedlitz, his world is collapsing. He showers the boy with reproaches and expels him from the house. Zedlitz is in shock himself, he cannot utter a single word in his own defense and storms out of the house in confusion. From then on, Kurt von Zedlitz seems to have disappeared from the face of the earth, and even District Administrator Kannewurf is beginning to worry. Again he gets into another encounter with Niemeyer. He seeks consolation from his wife Jadwiga, but she shows no interest in his problem.

Finally, the old professor learns of Kurt's pure intentions when he was arrested in the bakery. But it is too late. He still doesn't know that Kurt killed himself. Turning to the students, the professor quickly finds the strength for a forward-looking word: "He was no hero... so steel and harden yourselves and conquer yourself."

Cast

References

Bibliography

External links 
 

1936 films
Films of Nazi Germany
German drama films
1936 drama films
German historical films
1930s historical films
1930s German-language films
Films directed by Carl Froelich
German films based on plays
German black-and-white films
Tobis Film films
1930s German films